Yin Lianchi (born January 12, 1984)  in Guangzhou, Guangdong) is a Chinese épée fencer, who competed at the 2008 Summer Olympics and performed his personal best with the 4th épée team.

Major performances
2003 National Intercity Games - 1st épée individual

See also
China at the 2008 Summer Olympics

References

1984 births
Living people
Chinese male épée fencers
Fencers at the 2008 Summer Olympics
Olympic fencers of China
Asian Games medalists in fencing
Fencers at the 2010 Asian Games
Asian Games bronze medalists for China
Medalists at the 2010 Asian Games
Fencers from Guangzhou
21st-century Chinese people